Logan Township may refer to:

Arkansas
 Logan Township, Baxter County, Arkansas, in Baxter County, Arkansas
 Logan Township, Logan County, Arkansas, in Logan County, Arkansas

Illinois
 Logan Township, Peoria County, Illinois

Indiana
 Logan Township, Dearborn County, Indiana
 Logan Township, Fountain County, Indiana
 Logan Township, Pike County, Indiana

Iowa
 Logan Township, Calhoun County, Iowa
 Logan Township, Clay County, Iowa
 Logan Township, Ida County, Iowa
 Logan Township, Lyon County, Iowa
 Logan Township, Marshall County, Iowa
 Logan Township, Sioux County, Iowa
 Logan Township, Winnebago County, Iowa

Kansas
 Logan Township, Allen County, Kansas
 Logan Township, Barton County, Kansas
 Logan Township, Butler County, Kansas
 Logan Township, Decatur County, Kansas
 Logan Township, Dickinson County, Kansas
 Logan Township, Edwards County, Kansas
 Logan Township, Gray County, Kansas
 Logan Township, Lincoln County, Kansas, in Lincoln County, Kansas
 Logan Township, Marion County, Kansas
 Logan Township, Marshall County, Kansas, in Marshall County, Kansas
 Logan Township, Meade County, Kansas, in Meade County, Kansas
 Logan Township, Mitchell County, Kansas, in Mitchell County, Kansas
 Logan Township, Ottawa County, Kansas, in Ottawa County, Kansas
 Logan Township, Pawnee County, Kansas, in Pawnee County, Kansas
 Logan Township, Phillips County, Kansas, in Phillips County, Kansas
 Logan Township, Sheridan County, Kansas
 Logan Township, Sherman County, Kansas
 Logan Township, Smith County, Kansas, in Smith County, Kansas
 Logan Township, Washington County, Kansas, in Washington County, Kansas

Michigan
 Logan Township, Lenawee County, Michigan, now Adrian Charter Township
 Logan Township, Mason County, Michigan
 Logan Township, Ogemaw County, Michigan

Minnesota
 Logan Township, Aitkin County, Minnesota
 Logan Township, Grant County, Minnesota

Missouri
 Logan Township, Reynolds County, Missouri
 Logan Township, Wayne County, Missouri

Nebraska
 Logan Township, Adams County, Nebraska
 Logan Township, Antelope County, Nebraska
 Logan Township, Buffalo County, Nebraska
 Logan Township, Burt County, Nebraska
 Logan Township, Clay County, Nebraska
 Logan Township, Cuming County, Nebraska
 Logan Township, Dixon County, Nebraska
 Logan Township, Dodge County, Nebraska
 Logan Township, Gage County, Nebraska
 Logan Township, Kearney County, Nebraska
 Logan Township, Knox County, Nebraska

New Jersey
 Logan Township, New Jersey

North Dakota
 Logan Township, Burleigh County, North Dakota, in Burleigh County, North Dakota

Ohio
 Logan Township, Auglaize County, Ohio

Pennsylvania
 Logan Township, Blair County, Pennsylvania
 Logan Township, Clinton County, Pennsylvania
 Logan Township, Huntingdon County, Pennsylvania

South Dakota
 Logan Township, Beadle County, South Dakota, in Beadle County, South Dakota
 Logan Township, Clark County, South Dakota, in Clark County, South Dakota
 Logan Township, Hand County, South Dakota, in Hand County, South Dakota
 Logan Township, Jerauld County, South Dakota, in Jerauld County, South Dakota
 Logan Township, Minnehaha County, South Dakota, in Minnehaha County, South Dakota
 Logan Township, Sanborn County, South Dakota, in Sanborn County, South Dakota

See also
 Logan County (disambiguation)
 Logan (disambiguation)

Township name disambiguation pages